The Greenhouse site (16 AV 2) is an archaeological site of the Troyville-Coles Creek culture (400 to 1000 CE) in Avoyelles Parish, Louisiana.

Greenhouse is the most extensively excavated Troyville-Coles Creek site in Louisiana. Archaeologists have not found an associated village for the site, which supports the theory that the site was ceremonial in nature and that its builders lived elsewhere. Mound A ( in height, with a base  square and a summit  square), Mound E ( in height, with a base  square and a summit  square) and Mound G are the 3 largest mounds at the site and form a triangle.

See also
Culture, phase, and chronological table for the Mississippi Valley

References

External links
 
 Reconnecting the Present to the Past:The Caddo People Return to the Lower Red River Valley:Caddo Connections to the Lower Mississippi Valley
 Archaeological coring used at Greenhouse
 Archaeology of Louisiana By Mark A. Rees, Ian W. (FRW) Brown
 THE CADDO MOUNDBUILDER'S LEGACY
 Time's river: archaeological syntheses from the lower Mississippi River Valley By Janet Rafferty, Evan Peacock

Troyville culture
Archaeological sites of the Coles Creek culture
Mounds in Louisiana
Geography of Avoyelles Parish, Louisiana